Pelican Seaplane Base  is a public-use seaplane base located in and owned by the City of Pelican, on Chichagof Island in the Hoonah-Angoon Census Area of the U.S. state of Alaska. Scheduled airline service is subsidized by the Essential Air Service program.

The National Plan of Integrated Airport Systems for 2015-2019 categorized it as a general aviation airport based on 859 enplanements (passenger boardings) in 2012  (the commercial service category requires at least 2,500 enplanements per year). As per the Federal Aviation Administration, this airport had 744 enplanements in calendar year 2008, 550 in 2009, and 652 in 2010.

Facilities and aircraft
Pelican Seaplane Base has one runway designated NW/SE which measures 10,000 by 2,000 feet (3,048 x 610 m). For the 12-month period ending December 31, 2006, the airport had 350 aircraft operations, an average of 29 per month: 86% air taxi and 14% general aviation.

Airlines and destinations

Statistics

References

Other sources 

 Essential Air Service documents (Docket DOT-OST-2002-11586) from the U.S. Department of Transportation:
 Order 2003-1-27 (January 28, 2003): selecting Alaska Seaplane Service, LLC, to provide subsided essential air service at Elfin Cove and Pelican, Alaska, at an annual subsidy rate of $177,681 for a two-year term from February 1, 2003, through January 31, 2005.
 Order 2005-5-3 (May 10, 2005): selecting Alaska Seaplane Service to provide essential air service (EAS) to Pelican and Elfin Cove, Alaska, and establishing a subsidy rate of $216,593 per year.
 Order 2007-9-7 (September 7, 2007): granting the Petition for Reconsideration of Alaska Seaplane Service, LLC, and extending its subsidized essential air service (EAS) term at Elfin Cove and Pelican, Alaska, to a four-year term, through May 31, 2011.
 Order 2011-3-11 (March 9, 2011): re-selecting Alaska Seaplane Service, LLC, to provide essential air service (EAS) at Elfin Cove and Pelican, Alaska, at annual subsidy rates of $75,391 at Elfin Cove and $185,721 at Pelican, from June 1, 2011, through January 31, 2015. Pelican, Alaska: Docket OST-2002-11586. Scheduled Service: Six nonstop round trips per week year round to Juneau. Aircraft: DeHavilland Beaver, six seats.

External links 
 FAA Alaska airport diagram (GIF)
 Topographic map from USGS The National Map

Airports in the Hoonah–Angoon Census Area, Alaska
Essential Air Service
Seaplane bases in Alaska